"Reality" is a song by French composer Vladimir Cosma, performed by English singer Richard Sanderson. It was released in 1980 as part of the soundtrack to the popular 1980 French film La Boum, which starred French actress Sophie Marceau (who later starred in popular films such as Academy Award-winning Braveheart and James Bond franchise The World Is Not Enough). It also served as the theme song to the 2011 Korean film Sunny.

"Reality" is a ballad composed and written by Vladimir Cosma (under the name of Jeff Jordan) and produced by Pierre Richard Muller. Between 1980 and 1982, then in 1987 after its re-release, it became a major hit in Europe and Asia, topping the charts in fifteen countries including Germany, France, Italy, Austria, Finland and Switzerland. The song led Richard Sanderson to stardom, giving him more hits with Cosma such as "Your Eyes", "She's a Lady", and "Sun".

"Reality" has been covered many times by various artists, including one singing a Spanish version of the song ("Mi realidad"). On DSDS, the German equivalent of American Idol, the song has been sung multiple times. In the film La Boum, it also appears frequently (usually during the actors' romantic scenes), being the film's main theme song. For the film's 1982 sequel, La Boum 2, the main song was changed to "Your Eyes", performed by Cook da Books. Because "Reality" has the same key as "Go On Forever" (another song played in the last part of the film, from the La Boum soundtrack and sung by Sanderson and Chantal Curtis), both songs are musically linked at the end of the film.

The La Boum soundtrack album, which features the song "Reality", was made available on iTunes in 2009 by Larghetto.

Versions 

In the 1980s, "Reality" became an instant hit in some countries in Europe, Japan, South Korea, Hong Kong and the Philippines. It has been released in various forms. Some of them were remixed or mashed up, and released on one of Sanderson's compilation albums and/or played on radio stations.

Single 
The single version of the song omits some verses on the second repetition of the chorus (Maybe my foolishness is past, and maybe now at last, I see how the real thing can be), and ends with a fade effect. This version can be found on the singles released between 1980 and 1987, normally with another song from La Boum (most original copies had "Gotta Get A Move On" (Instrumental) by Karoline Krüger on the B-side, although some came with "I Can't Swim" or "Swingin' Around") and on The Best of Richard Sanderson.

Album 
The album version of the song has the omitted lines and ends with a defined musical melody. This is the most common version. It can be found on La Boum Original Soundtrack (old and new editions and the English edition), Sanderson's studio album Reality and compilation albums of his.

Instrumental 
An instrumental version appears on some vinyl editions of the single, the new edition of La Boum Original Soundtrack and The Best of Richard Sanderson. This version has a synth sound replacing Sanderson's voice, and a different guitar solo.

Extended 
There's an extended version of the song whose duration is about eight minutes and which repeats the verses and the chorus, as well as the guitar solo three times. It appears on The Best of Richard Sanderson.

The Special Mix 
Finally, there's a version called The Special Mix, which is a mashup of the album version and the instrumental version. It appears on some of Sanderson's EPs and compilation albums.

2009 
In 2009, Cosma and Sanderson made a new version of the song – this one having an orchestra style instead of synthesized sounds, and replacing the guitar solo. Sanderson's vocals were rerecorded for this version, except for the first verses.

2010 
There's also a 2010 version of the song with new synthesized sounds made by Sanderson.

2016 
This song was the closing scene in BoBoiBoy The Movie On Disney Channel Asia

Last-years 2016  
This song was the closing scene in the series in BoBoiBoy Galaxy on TVB Pearl

Instrumental or orchestral versions of the song by Vladimir Cosma 
In the film, the song's main melody is heard repeatedly with different sounds. Here are the songs that have the main melody and appear on the new edition of La Boum Soundtrack:

La rentrée
Poupette harpiste 
Retrouvailles sentimentales
Vic et Mathieu au ralenti

Chart positions

Weekly charts

Certifications

See also
 List of best-selling singles in France

References

Notes
I singoli più venduti del 1982 at Hit Parade Italia
German Top 20 - Top 400 Of The Decade, The 80s by Markus Tolksdorf

External links
 Watch "Reality" by Richard Sanderson on YouTube
 Reality – Richard Sanderson at the Internet Movie Database

1980 songs
1981 singles
British soft rock songs
Number-one singles in Austria
Number-one singles in Germany
Number-one singles in Italy
Number-one singles in Switzerland
SNEP Top Singles number-one singles
Barclay (record label) singles
Polydor Records singles
Universal Music Group singles